Trachicaranx tersus is an extinct primitive, pompano-like jack fish from what is now Turkmenistan.  It lived in an ocean upwelling with its relative, Archaeus oblongus during the Thanetian epoch of the late Paleocene.  Some incomplete fossil specimens were once identified as being a separate species, "Uylyaichthys eugeniae."

References

Paleocene genus extinctions
Carangidae
Paleocene fish of Asia